Patrick Tonyn (1725–1804) was a British General who served as the last British governor of East Florida, from 1774 to 1783. His governorship lasted the span of the American Revolution. East Florida was a Loyalist colony during the war.

Early life 
Patrick Tonyn was born in Berwick-upon-Tweed in Northumberland in 1725, into a military family. His father, Charles Tonyn, was a Colonel in the 6th Inniskillen Dragoons. Patrick Tonyn became a captain in the 6th Dragoons in 1751, with which regiment he served in Germany in 1758 during the Seven Years' War where, in 1759, the regiment fought at Minden and Wetter with great distinction. Tonyn was made lieutenant-colonel of the 104th Regiment of Foot in 1761.

Life in Florida and Revolution 
Tonyn is generally described as a capable commander. During his tenure as governor of East Florida the colony enjoyed peace with the neighboring Indians, primarily due to his positive relationship with Ahaya the Cowkeeper, chief of the Alachua band of the Seminole tribe.

Like most favored British officers, Tonyn received a large grant in the new colony—a  tract in 1767. This area of land was just south of Black Creek. Nautralist William Bartram, during his 1774 travels, noted that Tonyn's land grew indigo well. Bartram counted twenty enslaved workers when passing by the plantation. After a 1776 raid from Georgia, Tonyn was forced to give up this land for a plot east of the St. Johns River. 

Fort Tonyn, which was located in present-day Nassau County, Florida, near the hamlet of Mills's Ferry was named after Tonyn.

On 1 March, 1774, Tonyn arrived in St. Augustine, Florida as royal governor of East Florida. Throughout Tonyn's governorship, Loyalists from southern colonies sought refuge in St. Augustine. Another group was added to the population of the city when Andrew Turnbull's colony of New Smyrna to the south collapsed. Tonyn released the group (composed largely of Minorcans) from their indentures, and they too settled in St. Augustine in 1777. 

During the American Revolution, Tonyn raised four black militia units in East Florida. Those who served were promised freedom. However, due to the efforts of slave owners and the passing of stricter slave codes, few of those who fought were granted their freedom.  

From 1778 - 1785, Governor Tonyn lived in the coquina dwelling at 143 St. George Street in St. Augustine, in what is known today as the Peña-Peck House, run by the Woman's Exchange of St. Augustine.

Tonyn was instrumental in bringing his brother-in-law planter Francis Levett, an Englishman, to East Florida, having Levett given a seat on the Royal Council. Formerly a merchant in Leghorn, Italy, working for the Levant Company in Constantinople and scion of a well-connected English merchant family, Levett took up a large grant in Florida, which he later abandoned in favor of Georgia, where he was one of the first growers of Sea Island cotton. Levett's son-in-law Dr. David Yeats served as Secretary of the province of Florida under Governor Tonyn.

London and death 
Tonyn was the victim in a fraud and deception trial at the Old Bailey in May 1796. Henry Weston was indicted for forging Tonyn's signature to transfer of £5,000. The Old Bailey records show that Weston, a young man with gambling debts, was sentenced to death.

Patrick Tonyn died in London on 30 December 1804.

See also
 – several vessels named for him circa 1780.

References

External links
Julianton Plantation, Francis Levett Sr.

1725 births
1804 deaths
British Army generals
6th (Inniskilling) Dragoons officers
People from Berwick-upon-Tweed
Governors of East Florida
British Army personnel of the American Revolutionary War
British Army personnel of the Seven Years' War
People of British Florida